XHVFC-FM is a community radio station in Otumba, State of Mexico, broadcasting on 102.1 FM. The permit for the station is held by Voz, Flor y Canto, A.C., and the station is known as Evolución Radio. XHVFC is a member of AMARC México.

History
The station received its permit in March 2010 and came to air in February 2011. The station had been operating without a permit for some time before that.

References

Radio stations in the State of Mexico
Community radio stations in Mexico
Radio stations established in 2011